Kirk Matthew Bullinger (born October 28, 1969) is an American former professional baseball middle relief pitcher, who played in Major League Baseball (MLB) for the Montreal Expos, Boston Red Sox, Philadelphia Phillies, and Houston Astros (-). Bullinger threw and batted right-handed. He is the brother of former big league pitcher Jim Bullinger.

In a four-season career, Bullinger posted a 2–0 record with a 6.53 ERA and one save in 49 games pitched.

Bullinger played college baseball at Southeastern Louisiana University. In 1992, Bullinger threw a one-hitter for the Lions in the Trans America Athletic Conference (now Atlantic Sun Conference) baseball tournament.

Coaching career
In 2009, Bullinger was assistant baseball coach at the University of New Orleans. There, he served as pitching coach and also assisted with recruiting. Bullinger then coached pitchers for the Nola Monsters Baseball Club, an amateur travel team based in Louisiana. He is now head baseball coach at Archbishop Shaw High School in Marrero, Louisiana.

References

External links

Retrosheet

1969 births
Living people
Akron Aeros players
American expatriate baseball players in Canada
Baseball coaches from Louisiana
Baseball players from New Orleans
Boston Red Sox players
Charlotte Knights players
Gulf Coast Expos players
Florida Complex League Phillies players
Hamilton Redbirds players
Harrisburg Senators players
Houston Astros players
Indianapolis Indians players
Jupiter Hammerheads players
Major League Baseball pitchers
Montreal Expos players
New Orleans Zephyrs players
Ottawa Lynx players
Pawtucket Red Sox players
Philadelphia Phillies players
Reading Phillies players
Scranton/Wilkes-Barre Red Barons players
Somerset Patriots players
Southeastern Louisiana Lions baseball players
Springfield Cardinals players
St. Petersburg Cardinals players
Trenton Thunder players
West Palm Beach Expos players